David Wilcox (born September 29, 1942) is an American former professional football player who was a linebacker with the San Francisco 49ers of the National Football League (NFL) from 1964 through 1974. Wilcox was selected to play for seven Pro Bowls and was named All-NFL five times during his career. He was elected to the Pro Football Hall of Fame

College career

Boise Junior College & Oregon
After graduating from Vale High School in eastern Oregon in 1960, Wilcox began his college football career at Boise Junior College (now Boise State University) and earned junior college All-America honors. After two years in Boise under head coach Lyle Smith, he transferred to the University of Oregon in Eugene in 1962 for his final two campaigns under head coach Len Casanova; His older brother John Wilcox had played for the Ducks on the 1957 team that went to the Rose Bowl, and was selected in the 1960 NFL Draft by the Philadelphia Eagles (15th round).

Wilcox was a guard on offense and an end on defense, and teammates at Oregon included Mel Renfro and quarterback Bob Berry. After his senior season in 1963, Wilcox played in the Hula Bowl, Coaches’ All-America Bowl, and the College All-Star Game the following August. He became the first defensive lineman in Hula Bowl history to earn outstanding lineman honors. Both the Houston Oilers of the young American Football League and the San Francisco 49ers of the NFL sought to sign the Oregon star. The Oilers selected him in the sixth round (46th player overall) of the AFL draft, while the 49ers tapped him in the third round (29th overall) of the NFL draft, held two days later.

Professional career

San Francisco 49ers
The ,  Wilcox opted to sign with the more established 49ers where he went on to star for 11 seasons. Converted to outside linebacker, Wilcox quickly established himself as one of the league’s finest. Nicknamed "the Intimidator," he was ideally suited for the position, both mentally and physically. Known for his ability to disrupt plays, he was particularly tough on tight ends. He did not let anybody easily off the line of scrimmage whether to block or get into a pass route. Always prepared, Wilcox was a true student of the game and worked to be fundamentally correct.

During the 1964–1974 span, the 49ers had a winning record in four seasons (1965, 1970, 1971, 1972), and made the playoffs in three consecutive seasons (1970, 1971, 1972) under head coach Dick Nolan. In 1970, San Francisco won the NFC West division title with a win-lost-tie record of  In a divisional game of the 1970 NFL Playoffs, San Francisco defeated the Minnesota Vikings  holding them to 124 net passing yards and 117 yards rushing. However, they lost the NFC championship game to the Dallas Cowboys.
In 1971, the 49ers had a particularly good year on defense, allowing only 216 points (15.4 points/game), 6th least in the NFL, and won the NFC West with a record of 9–5. They won their divisional game of the 1971 NFL Playoffs over the Washington Redskins, allowing only 99 yards rushing and 93 net passing yards, but again lost the NFC championship game to Dallas. In 1972, San Francisco won the NFC West for the third straight year with a record of 8–5–1, allowing on defense 249 points (17.8 points/game), 9th in the league. But they lost their divisional game of the 1972 NFL Playoffs to Dallas, thus eliminated by the Cowboys three consecutive years. In those three years, Wilcox at left side linebacker formed a strong tandem with middle linebacker Frank Nunley and right linebacker Skip Vanderbundt.

He thrived on action and wanted it all directed his way. "What I do best," Wilcox once stated, "is not let people block me. I just hate to be blocked." Hall of Fame linebacker Joe Schmidt was impressed by his strength. "He gave us fits," he remarked. "The lead block had to really come out hard to take him out because he was so strong." Aided by his speed and long reach, he was also effective in pass coverage and managed to intercept 14 passes during his career.

Following each season, San Francisco would rate their players based on their performance. The typical score for a linebacker was 750. Wilcox’s score in 1973 was 1,306. That season the veteran linebacker recorded 104 solo tackles, four forced fumbles, and tackled opposing ball carriers for a loss 13 times. Durable, Wilcox missed only one game during his career due to injury. Four times he was named All-NFL (1967, 1971, 1972, 1973) by the AP and two times All-NFC (1971, 1972). He was also selected to play in seven Pro Bowls.

Personal
Born in the eastern Oregon city of Ontario, Wilcox had six sisters and one brother.  Wilcox played high school football at nearby Vale Union High School. He lives in Junction City, near Eugene, where his sons Justin and Josh also played football for the Oregon Ducks. Justin Wilcox currently serves as the head coach for the California Golden Bears, a Pac-12 Conference foe of Oregon.

References

External links
 

1942 births
Living people
American football linebackers
Oregon Ducks football players
San Francisco 49ers players
National Conference Pro Bowl players
Pro Football Hall of Fame inductees
Western Conference Pro Bowl players
People from Junction City, Oregon
People from Ontario, Oregon
Players of American football from Oregon